The 2021–22 season is Aizawl's 38th competitive season and its fifth competitive season in the I-League, India's top-flight professional football league.

Squad Information

 
 
 
 
 
 

   

 

 
 

 

(on loan from Hyderabad)

Extended contracts

Transfers

In

Loans in

Out

Loans Out

Technical staff

Competitions

Overview

I-League

League table

References

Aizawl FC seasons